"Penguins & Polarbears" is a song by the Swedish punk rock band Millencolin from the album Pennybridge Pioneers. It was released as a single on 24 January 2000 by Burning Heart Records, including two B-sides from the album's recording sessions, "Queen's Gambit" and "Dinner Dog". An accompanying music video for "Penguins & Polarbears" was also filmed and released released on disc 2 for the CD release. In Triple J's Hottest 100 for 2000 the song was number 41.

Track listing
CD single
"Penguins & Polarbears"
"Queens Gambit"
"Dinner Dog"

7" vinyl
Side A:
"Penguins & Polarbears"
"Queens Gambit"
Side B:
"Dinner Dog"
"An Elf and His Zippo"

References

Millencolin songs
2000 singles
2000 songs
Burning Heart Records singles
Songs written by Mathias Färm
Songs written by Nikola Šarčević
Songs written by Fredrik Larzon
Songs written by Erik Ohlsson (musician)